Pura sangre (English title: Thoroughbred: Between the Justice and Revenge) is a Colombian telenovela produced and broadcast by RCN Televisión in 2007.

Cast 
 Rafael Novoa as Eduardo Montenegro / Marco Vieira
 Marcela Mar as Florencia Lagos
 Kathy Sáenz as Paulina Riascos/Regina Castaño "La Hiena"
 Pepe Sánchez as Don Alejandro Lagos / Don Eusebio Beltrán
 Helga Díaz as Irene Lagos
 Juan Pablo Gamboa as Federico Lagos / Pedronel Lagos
 Andrés Juan as Camilo Lagos
 Manuel José Chávez as Simón Lagos
 Silvia de Dios as Susana Suescún de Lagos
 Edgardo Román as Atila Carranza
  as Renato León
 Carlos Hurtado as Aristides Bocanegra
 Juliana Galvis as Silvia Vallejo
 Carolina Cuervo as Azucena Flores de Chaparro
 Alejandra Sandoval as Lucía Velandia (Beltrán Castaño)
 Carlos Manuel Vesga as Isidro Chaparro
 Fernando Arévalo as Dr. Ortegón
 Jenny Osorio as Margarita Flores
 Marcela Benjumea as Rosa Flores
 Manuel Sarmiento as Samuel Delgado
 Diego Vélez as Padre Matías
 Ramsés Ramos as Freddy William
 Claudia Aguirre as Iliana
 Inés Prieto as Inés Bueno
 María Fernanda Yepes as Natalia / Venus
 Renata González as Marcela Carranza
 Jason Bawth Chad as Mike Horton
 Margalida Castro as Clotilde
 Jaime Barbini as José María Cabal
 Alejandra Borrero as Genoveva de Lagos
 Carmenza Gómez as María de Montenegro
 Martina García as Ana Gregoria Beltrán
 Laura Perico as Irene Lagos (young) 
 Etty Grossman as Florencia Lagos (young)
 Federico Rivera as Kojac

Awards and nominations

Prêmio TVyNovelas

Mexican version 
 Mañana es para siempre (2008-2009) - a Mexican telenovela produced by Televisa, starring Fernando Colunga, Silvia Navarro, Rogelio Guerra, Sergio Sendel and Lucero.

References

External links 
 

2007 telenovelas
Colombian telenovelas
2007 Colombian television series debuts
2007 Colombian television series endings
Spanish-language telenovelas
RCN Televisión telenovelas
Television shows set in Bogotá